At the Speed of Life is the debut studio album by American rapper Xzibit. It was released on October 15, 1996 by Loud Records and RCA Records.

Reception

Track listing

Credits adapted from the album's liner notes.

Notes
Tash of Tha Alkaholiks is credited as Catastraphe on "Bird's Eye View"
"At the Speed of Life" contains monologue from the film Taxi Driver

Personnel

Thayod Ausar – Producer, Engineer
B+ – Photography
Diamond D – Producer
DJ Pen One – Producer
Ross Donaldson – Engineer, Mixing
E-Swift – Producer, Engineer, Executive Producer
Brian Gardner – Mastering
Jean-Marie Horvat – Mixing
Ola Kudu – Artwork, Art Direction, Layout Design
Brian "Bizzy" McCane – Mastering
DJ Muggs – Producer, Engineer
Noa Ochi – Coordination
Saafir – Producer
Craig Sherrad – Producer
Xzibit – Executive Producer

Chart positions

Weekly charts

Year-end charts

Singles

In popular culture
The single "Paparazzi" was featured on the Tony Hawk's Pro Skater 3 video game soundtrack. An instrumental version of the same song was also featured during the final scene of The Sopranos sixth episode "Pax Soprana."

References

1996 debut albums
Xzibit albums
RCA Records albums
Loud Records albums
Albums produced by Diamond D
Albums produced by DJ Muggs